The IBM Personal System/2 Model CL57 SX (stylized as PS/2 Model CL57 SX) is the first laptop with a color TFT screen released by IBM in 1992. It was released a few months before the introduction of the ThinkPad series.

Background 
It was developed by a joint venture between IBM and Toshiba. The sibling model in a PS/55 line was a PS/55 N27sx laptop.

Specifications 
It is based on the Micro Channel Architecture.

It can run IBM OS/2. 

Reception 
It was not favorably received by the market.

References

External links 

 Laptop.pics
 Product info

PS/2 Color Laptop 57 SX
Color Laptop 57 SX